Season of Good Rain, also known as A Good Rain Knows, is a 2009 film by Hur Jin-ho. It stars South Korean actor Jung Woo-sung and Chinese actress Gao Yuanyuan. The film was released to South Korean theaters on October 8 and had a total of 287,887 admissions.

Originally intended as the second segment of Chengdu, I Love You, the director and producers expanded its running time and released it as a stand-alone feature.

Plot
Timely like the spring rain, so has he come back into my life ... . Dong-ha is a thirty-something Korean architect on a business trip to Chengdu, China where his company is carrying out construction projects to rebuild the city after the earthquake of 2008. By chance, he meets May, an old friend from his school days in the U.S. May is originally from Chengdu, where she had returned to after graduation; she works as a tour guide. Dong-ha and May had feelings for each other then, but they parted  before they had a chance to define or declare them. Now that they are thrown together again, they find that these old feelings reignite and new ones form.

Cast
 Jung Woo-sung as Park Dong-ha 
 Gao Yuanyuan as May (Wu Yue)
 Kim Sang-ho as President Ji
 Ma Shaohua as Director Ma

References

External links 
  
 
 
 

2009 films
2009 romantic drama films
2000s Korean-language films
Chinese romantic drama films
Films directed by Hur Jin-ho
Next Entertainment World films
South Korean romantic drama films
2000s South Korean films
2000s Chinese films